"Lover Please" is a 1962 song written by Billy Swan and first recorded by the Rhythm Steppers in 1960.  It is most known for the version performed by Clyde McPhatter on his 1962 album Lover Please!
where it went to #7 on the U.S. pop chart. Overseas, it reached #6 in Norway.   The song ranked #41 on Billboard magazine's Top 100 singles of 1962.

Other charting versions
The Vernons Girls released a version of the song in 1962 which reached #16 on the UK Singles Chart.
Bobby G. Rice released a version of the song in 1971 which reached #46 on the U.S. country chart.
Kris Kristofferson and Rita Coolidge released a version of the song in 1975 which reached #42 on the adult contemporary chart.  It was featured on their 1974 album Breakaway. Their version won the Grammy Award for Best Country Performance by a Duo or Group with Vocal at the 18th Annual Grammy Awards in 1976.
Cindy Church released a version of the song in 1997 which reached #44 on the Canadian country chart.

Other versions
Arthur Alexander released a version of the song on his 1962 album You Better Move On.
The Marvelettes released a version of the song on their 1962 album The Marvelettes Sing.
Swan released a version of the song on his 1974 album I Can Help.
Orion released a version of the song on his 1979 album Reborn.
Jonathan Richman & The Modern Lovers released a version of the song on their 1979 album Back in Your Life.
Status Quo released a version of the song as part of the 1990 single "The Anniversary Waltz (Part Two)".
Kinky Friedman released a version of the song on his 2007 live album Live from Austin TX.
Colin Linden & Luther Dickinson with The Tennessee Valentines released a cover of the song on their 2019 album Armour.

References

1960 songs
1962 singles
1971 singles
1975 singles
1990 singles
1997 singles
Clyde McPhatter songs
Bobby G. Rice songs
Kris Kristofferson songs
Rita Coolidge songs
Arthur Alexander songs
The Marvelettes songs
The Modern Lovers songs
Status Quo (band) songs
Billy Swan songs
Mercury Records singles
Monument Records singles
Vertigo Records singles
Songs written by Billy Swan